Speedwell Township is an inactive township in St. Clair County, in the U.S. state of Missouri.

Speedwell Township was erected in 1841, and named after one Mr. Speedwell, a government surveyor.

References

Townships in Missouri
Townships in St. Clair County, Missouri